Neutral Yer (Majuscule: ,) is used to transcribe Ь or Ъ when it is not possible to tell the difference in a historic manuscript.

It has the appearance of Yer, with a hook at the top of the stem. In some fonts it appears identical to Ъ.

Computing codes

References

Cyrillic letters